Review is the first greatest hits album by Japanese rock band Glay. It was released on October 10, 1997, and contains the band's most popular songs from their 1994 album Hai to Diamond to their fourth album Beloved. The album sold over 2,003,000 copies in the first week of release, debuting at number-one on the Japanese Oricon Albums Chart. It remained in the top position for five consecutive weeks. Review was certified for five million copies sold by the Recording Industry Association of Japan in December 1998, making it the fifth best-selling album in Japanese history.

Track listing

Kanojo no "Modern..." (彼女の "Modern…")
Beloved
More Than Love
Sen no Knife ga Mune wo Sasu (千ノナイフガ胸ヲ刺ス)
Zutto Futari de... (ずっと2人で...)
Kuchibiru (口唇)
Rhapsody
However
Freeze My Love
Kissin' Noise
Kiseki no Hate (軌跡の果て)

References

 Reviews page at Oricon

External links 
 Glay Official Site

Glay albums
1997 compilation albums